Noah Webster Jr. (October 16, 1758 – May 28, 1843) was an American lexicographer, textbook pioneer, English-language spelling reformer, political writer, editor, and author. He has been called the "Father of American Scholarship and Education". His "Blue-backed Speller" books taught five generations of American children how to spell and read. Webster's name has become synonymous with "dictionary" in the United States, especially the modern Merriam-Webster dictionary that was first published in 1828 as An American Dictionary of the English Language.

Born in West Hartford, Connecticut, Webster graduated from Yale College in 1778. He passed the bar examination after studying law under Oliver Ellsworth and others, but was unable to find work as a lawyer. He found some financial success by opening a private school and writing a series of educational books, including the "Blue-Backed Speller". A strong supporter of the American Revolution and the ratification of the United States Constitution, Webster later criticized American society for being in need of an intellectual foundation. He believed that American nationalism was superior to Europe because American values were superior.

In 1793, Alexander Hamilton recruited Webster to move to New York City and become an editor for a Federalist Party newspaper. He became a prolific author, publishing newspaper articles, political essays, and textbooks. He returned to Connecticut in 1798 and served in the Connecticut House of Representatives. Webster founded the Connecticut Society for the Abolition of Slavery in 1791 but later became somewhat disillusioned with the abolitionist movement.

In 1806, Webster published his first dictionary, A Compendious Dictionary of the English Language. The following year, he started working on an expanded and comprehensive dictionary, finally publishing it in 1828. He was very influential in popularizing certain spellings in the United States. He was also influential in establishing the Copyright Act of 1831, the first major statutory revision of U.S. copyright law. Whilst working on a second volume of his dictionary, Webster died in 1843, and the rights to the dictionary were acquired by George and Charles Merriam.

Biography
Webster was born in the Western Division of Hartford (which became West Hartford, Connecticut) to an established family. His birthplace is the Noah Webster House which highlights Webster's life and is the headquarters of the West Hartford Historical Society. His father Noah Webster Sr. (1722–1813) was a descendant of Connecticut Governor John Webster; his mother Mercy (Steele) Webster (1727–1794) was a descendant of Governor William Bradford of Plymouth Colony. His father was primarily a farmer, though he was also deacon of the local Congregational church, captain of the town's militia, and a founder of a local book society (a precursor to the public library). After American independence, he was appointed a justice of the peace.

Webster's father never attended college, but he was intellectually curious and prized education. Webster's mother spent long hours teaching her children spelling, mathematics, and music. At age six, Webster began attending a dilapidated one-room primary school built by West Hartford's Ecclesiastical Society. Years later, he described the teachers as the "dregs of humanity" and complained that the instruction was mainly in religion. Webster's experiences there motivated him to improve the educational experience of future generations.

At age fourteen, his church pastor began tutoring him in Latin and Greek to prepare him for entering Yale College. Webster enrolled at Yale just before his 16th birthday, studying during his senior year with Ezra Stiles, Yale's president. He also was a member of the secret society, Brothers in Unity. His four years at Yale overlapped the American Revolutionary War and, because of food shortages and the possibility of British invasion, many of his classes had to be held in other towns. Webster served in the Connecticut Militia. His father had mortgaged the farm to send Webster to Yale, but he was now on his own and had nothing more to do with his family.

Webster lacked career plans after graduating from Yale in 1779, later writing that a liberal arts education "disqualifies a man for business". He taught school briefly in Glastonbury, but the working conditions were harsh and the pay low. He quit to study law. While studying law under future U.S. Supreme Court Chief Justice Oliver Ellsworth, Webster also taught full-time in Hartford—which was grueling, and ultimately impossible to continue. He quit his legal studies for a year and lapsed into a depression; he then found another practicing attorney to tutor him, and completed his studies and passed the bar examination in 1781. As the Revolutionary War was still going on, he could not find work as a lawyer. He received a master's degree from Yale by giving an oral dissertation to the Yale graduating class. Later that year, he opened a small private school in western Connecticut that was a success. Nevertheless, he soon closed it and left town, probably because of a failed romance. Turning to literary work as a way to overcome his losses and channel his ambitions, he began writing a series of well-received articles for a prominent New England newspaper justifying and praising the American Revolution and arguing that the separation from Britain would be a permanent state of affairs. He then founded a private school catering to wealthy parents in Goshen, New York and, by 1785, he had written his speller, a grammar book and a reader for elementary schools. Proceeds from continuing sales of the popular blue-backed speller enabled Webster to spend many years working on his famous dictionary.

Webster was by nature a revolutionary, seeking American independence from the cultural thralldom to Europe. To replace it, he sought to create a utopian America, cleansed of luxury and ostentation and the champion of freedom. By 1781, Webster had an expansive view of the new nation. American nationalism was superior to Europe because American values were superior, he claimed.

Webster dedicated his Speller and Dictionary to providing an intellectual foundation for American nationalism. From 1787 to 1789, Webster was an outspoken supporter of the new Constitution. In October 1787, he wrote a pamphlet entitled "An Examination into the Leading Principles of the Federal Constitution Proposed by the Late Convention Held at Philadelphia", published under the pen name "A Citizen of America". The pamphlet was influential, particularly outside New York State.

In terms of political theory, he de-emphasized virtue (a core value of republicanism) and emphasized widespread ownership of property (a key element of Federalism). He was one of the few Americans who paid much attention to French theorist Jean-Jacques Rousseau. It was not Rousseau's politics but his ideas on pedagogy in Emile (1762) that influenced Webster in adjusting his Speller to the stages of a child's development.

Federalist editor

Noah Webster married Rebecca Greenleaf (1766–1847) on October 26, 1789, New Haven, Connecticut. They had eight children:
 Emily Schotten (1790–1861), who married William W. Ellsworth, named by Webster as an executor of his will. Emily, their daughter, married Rev. Abner Jackson, who became president of both Hartford's Trinity College and Hobart College in New York State.
 Frances Julianna (1793–1869), married Chauncey Allen Goodrich
 Harriet (1797–1844), who married William Chauncey Fowler
 Mary (1799–1819) m. Horatio Southgate (1781-1864), son of Dr. Robert and Mary King Southgate
 William Greenleaf (1801–1869)
 Eliza Steele (1803–1888) m. Rev. Henry Jones (1801-1878)
 Henry Bradford (1806–1807)
 Louisa Greenleaf (1808-1874)

Webster married well and had joined the elite in Hartford but did not have much money. In 1793, Alexander Hamilton lent him $1,500 to move to New York City to edit the leading Federalist Party newspaper. In December, he founded New York's first daily newspaper American Minerva (later known as the Commercial Advertiser), which he edited for four years, writing the equivalent of 20 volumes of articles and editorials. He also published the semi-weekly publication The Herald, A Gazette for the country (later known as The New York Spectator).

As a Federalist spokesman, he defended the administrations of George Washington and John Adams, especially their policy of neutrality between Britain and France, and he especially criticized the excesses of the French Revolution and its Reign of Terror. When French ambassador Citizen Genêt set up a network of pro-Jacobin "Democratic-Republican Societies" that entered American politics and attacked President Washington, he condemned them. He later defended Jay's Treaty between the United States and Britain. As a result, he was repeatedly denounced by the Jeffersonian Republicans as "a pusillanimous, half-begotten, self-dubbed patriot", "an incurable lunatic", and "a deceitful newsmonger ... Pedagogue and Quack."

For decades, he was one of the most prolific authors in the new nation, publishing textbooks, political essays, a report on infectious diseases, and newspaper articles for his Federalist party. He wrote so much that a modern bibliography of his published works required 655 pages. He moved back to New Haven in 1798; he was elected as a Federalist to the Connecticut House of Representatives in 1800 and 1802–1807.

Webster was elected a Fellow of the American Academy of Arts and Sciences in 1799. He moved to Amherst, Massachusetts in 1812, where he helped to found Amherst College. In 1822 the family moved back to New Haven, where Webster was awarded an honorary degree from Yale the following year. In 1827, Webster was elected to the American Philosophical Society.

Blue-backed speller

As a teacher, he had come to dislike American elementary schools. They could be overcrowded, with up to seventy children of all ages crammed into one-room schoolhouses. They had poor, underpaid staff, no desks, and unsatisfactory textbooks that came from England. Webster thought that Americans should learn from American books, so he began writing the three volume compendium A Grammatical Institute of the English Language. The work consisted of a speller (published in 1783), a grammar (published in 1784), and a reader (published in 1785). His goal was to provide a uniquely American approach to training children. His most important improvement, he claimed, was to rescue "our native tongue" from "the clamour of pedantry" that surrounded English grammar and pronunciation. He complained that the English language had been corrupted by the British aristocracy, which set its own standard for proper spelling and pronunciation. Webster rejected the notion that the study of Greek and Latin must precede the study of English grammar. The appropriate standard for the American language, argued Webster, was "the same republican principles as American civil and ecclesiastical constitutions." This meant that the people-at-large must control the language; popular sovereignty in government must be accompanied by popular usage in language.

The Speller was arranged so that it could be easily taught to students, and it progressed by age. From his own experiences as a teacher, Webster thought that the Speller should be simple and gave an orderly presentation of words and the rules of spelling and pronunciation. He believed that students learned most readily when he broke a complex problem into its component parts and had each pupil master one part before moving to the next. Ellis argues that Webster anticipated some of the insights currently associated with Jean Piaget's theory of cognitive development. Webster said that children pass through distinctive learning phases in which they master increasingly complex or abstract tasks. Therefore, teachers must not try to teach a three-year-old how to read; they could not do it until age five. He organized his speller accordingly, beginning with the alphabet and moving systematically through the different sounds of vowels and consonants, then syllables, then simple words, then more complex words, then sentences.

The speller was originally titled The First Part of the Grammatical Institute of the English Language. Over the course of 385 editions in his lifetime, the title was changed in 1786 to The American Spelling Book, and again in 1829 to The Elementary Spelling Book. Most people called it the "Blue-Backed Speller" because of its blue cover and, for the next one hundred years, Webster's book taught children how to read, spell, and pronounce words. It was the most popular American book of its time; by 1837, it had sold 15 million copies, and some 60 million by 1890—reaching the majority of young students in the nation's first century. Its royalty of a half-cent per copy was enough to sustain Webster in his other endeavors. It also helped create the popular contests known as spelling bees.

As time went on, Webster changed the spellings in the book to more phonetic ones. Most of them already existed as alternative spellings. He chose spellings such as defense, color, and traveler, and changed the re to er in words such as center. He also changed tongue to the older spelling tung, but this did not catch on.

Part three of his Grammatical Institute (1785) was a reader designed to uplift the mind and "diffuse the principles of virtue and patriotism."

Students received the usual quota of Plutarch, Shakespeare, Swift, and Addison, as well as such Americans as Joel Barlow's Vision of Columbus, Timothy Dwight's Conquest of Canaan, and John Trumbull's poem M'Fingal. He included excerpts from Tom Paine's The Crisis and an essay by Thomas Day calling for the abolition of slavery in accord with the Declaration of Independence.

Webster's Speller was entirely secular by design. It ended with two pages of important dates in American history, beginning with Columbus's discovery of America in 1492 and ending with the battle of Yorktown in 1781. There was no mention of God, the Bible, or sacred events. "Let sacred things be appropriated for sacred purposes", Webster wrote. As Ellis explains, "Webster began to construct a secular catechism to the nation-state. Here was the first appearance of 'civics' in American schoolbooks. In this sense, Webster's speller becoming what was to be the secular successor to The New England Primer with its explicitly biblical injunctions." Later in life, Webster became intensely religious and added religious themes. However, after 1840, Webster's books lost market share to the McGuffey Eclectic Readers of William Holmes McGuffey, which sold over 120 million copies.

Vincent P. Bynack (1984) examines Webster in relation to his commitment to the idea of a unified American national culture that would stave off the decline of republican virtues and solidarity. Webster acquired his perspective on language from such theorists as Maupertuis, Michaelis, and Herder. There he found the belief that a nation's linguistic forms and the thoughts correlated with them shaped individuals' behavior. Thus, the etymological clarification and reform of American English promised to improve citizens' manners and thereby preserve republican purity and social stability. This presupposition animated Webster's Speller and Grammar.

Dictionary

Publication

In 1806, Webster published his first dictionary, A Compendious Dictionary of the English Language. In 1807 Webster began compiling an expanded and fully comprehensive dictionary, An American Dictionary of the English Language; it took twenty-six years to complete. To evaluate the etymology of words, Webster learned twenty-eight languages, including Old English, Gothic, German, Greek, Latin, Italian, Spanish, French, Dutch, Welsh, Russian, Hebrew, Aramaic, Persian, Arabic, and Sanskrit. Webster hoped to standardize American speech, since Americans in different parts of the country used different languages. They also spelled, pronounced, and used English words differently.

Webster completed his dictionary during his year abroad in January 1825 in a boarding house in Cambridge, England. His book contained seventy thousand words, of which twelve thousand had never appeared in a published dictionary before. As a spelling reformer, Webster preferred spellings that matched pronunciation better. In A Companion to the American Revolution (2008), John Algeo notes: "It is often assumed that characteristically American spellings were invented by Noah Webster. He was very influential in popularizing certain spellings in America, but he did not originate them. Rather ... he chose already existing options such as center, color and check on such grounds as simplicity, analogy or etymology." He also added American words, like "skunk", that did not appear in British dictionaries. At the age of seventy, Webster published his dictionary in 1828, registering the copyright on April 14.

Though it now has an honoured place in the history of American English, Webster's first dictionary only sold 2,500 copies. He was forced to mortgage his home to develop a second edition, and for the rest of his life he had debt problems.

In 1840, the second edition was published in two volumes. On May 28, 1843, a few days after he had completed making more specific definitions, to the second edition, and with much of his efforts with the dictionary still unrecognized, Noah Webster died. His last words were, "I am entirely submissive to the will of God." He died later that evening. The rights to his dictionary were acquired by George and Charles Merriam in 1843 from Webster's estate and all contemporary Merriam-Webster dictionaries trace their lineage to that of Webster, although many others have adopted his name, attempting to share in the popularity. He is buried in New Haven's Grove Street Cemetery.

Influence
Lepore (2008) demonstrates Webster's paradoxical ideas about language and politics and shows why Webster's endeavors were at first so poorly received. Culturally conservative Federalists denounced the work as radical—too inclusive in its lexicon and even bordering on vulgar. Meanwhile, Webster's old foes the Republicans attacked the man, labeling him mad for such an undertaking.

Scholars have long seen Webster's 1844 dictionary to be an important resource for reading poet Emily Dickinson's life and work; she once commented that the "Lexicon" was her "only companion" for years. One biographer said, "The dictionary was no mere reference book to her; she read it as a priest his breviary—over and over, page by page, with utter absorption."

Nathan Austin has explored the intersection of lexicographical and poetic practices in American literature, and attempts to map out a "lexical poetics" using Webster's definitions as his base. Poets mined his dictionaries, often drawing upon the lexicography in order to express word play. Austin explicates key definitions from both the Compendious (1806) and American (1828) dictionaries, and finds a range of themes such as the politics of "American" versus "British" English and issues of national identity and independent culture. Austin argues that Webster's dictionaries helped redefine Americanism in an era of highly flexible cultural identity. Webster himself saw the dictionaries as a nationalizing device to separate America from Britain, calling his project a "federal language", with competing forces towards regularity on the one hand and innovation on the other. Austin suggests that the contradictions of Webster's lexicography were part of a larger play between liberty and order within American intellectual discourse, with some pulled toward Europe and the past, and others pulled toward America and the new future.

In 1850 Blackie and Son in Glasgow published the first general dictionary of English that relied heavily upon pictorial illustrations integrated with the text. Its The Imperial Dictionary, English, Technological, and Scientific, Adapted to the Present State of Literature, Science, and Art; On the Basis of Webster's English Dictionary used Webster's for most of their text, adding some additional technical words that went with illustrations of machinery.

Views

Religion

Webster in early life was something of a freethinker, but in 1808 he became a convert to Calvinistic orthodoxy, and thereafter became a devout Congregationalist who preached the need to Christianize the nation. Webster grew increasingly authoritarian and elitist, fighting against the prevailing grain of Jacksonian Democracy. Webster viewed language as a tool to control unruly thoughts. His American Dictionary emphasized the virtues of social control over human passions and individualism, submission to authority, and fear of God; they were necessary for the maintenance of the American social order. As he grew older, Webster's attitudes changed from those of an optimistic revolutionary in the 1780s to those of a pessimistic critic of man and society by the 1820s.

His 1828 American Dictionary contained the greatest number of Biblical definitions given in any reference volume. Webster said of education,

Webster released his own edition of the Bible in 1833, called the Common Version. He used the King James Version (KJV) as a base and consulted the Hebrew and Greek along with various other versions and commentaries. Webster molded the KJV to correct grammar, replaced words that were no longer used, and removed words and phrases that could be seen as offensive.

In 1834, he published Value of the Bible and Excellence of the Christian Religion, an apologetic book in defense of the Bible and Christianity itself.

Slavery

Initially supportive of the abolitionist movement, Webster helped found the Connecticut Society for the Abolition of Slavery in 1791. However, by the 1830's he began to disagree with the movement's arguments that Americans who did not actively oppose the institution of slavery were complicit in the system. In 1832, Webster wrote and published a history textbook titled History of the United States, which omitted any reference to the role of slavery in American history and included racist characterizations of African Americans. The textbook also "spoke of whiteness as the supreme race and declared Anglo Saxons as the only true Americans." In 1837, Webster criticized his daughter Eliza for her support for the abolitionist movement, writing that "slavery is a great sin and a general calamity—but it is not our sin, though it may prove to be a terrible calamity to us in the north. But we cannot legally interfere with the South on this subject. To come north to preach and thus disturb our peace, when we can legally do nothing to effect this object, is, in my view, highly criminal and the preachers of abolitionism deserve the penitentiary."

Copyright

The Copyright Act of 1831 was the first major statutory revision of U.S. copyright law, a result of intensive lobbying by Noah Webster and his agents in Congress. Webster also played a critical role lobbying individual states throughout the country during the 1780s to pass the first American copyright laws, which were expected to have distinct nationalistic implications for the young nation.

Selected works 
 Dissertation on the English Language (1789)
 Collection of Essays and Fugitive Writings on Moral, Historical, Political, and Literary Subjects (1790)
 The American Spelling Book (1783)
 The Elementary Spelling Book (1829)
 Value of The Bible and Excellence of the Christian Religion (1834)

Posthumous 
 Rudiments of English Grammar (1899)

See also
 First Party System
 Webster, Wisconsin, a town named for Noah Webster

Notes

References
 "Noah Webster" in The Cambridge History of English and American Literature in 18 Volumes (1907–21). vol 18 section 25:33 online edition
 
 Ellis, Joseph J. After the Revolution: Profiles of Early American Culture 1979. chapter 6, interpretive essay online edition
 Gallardo, Andres. "The Standardization of American English." PhD dissertation State U. of New York, Buffalo 1980. 367 pp. DAI 1981 41(8): 3557-A. 8104193, focused on Webster's dictionary
 Kendall, Joshua. The Forgotten Founding Father: Noah Webster's Obsession and the Creation of an American Culture (2011)
 Leavitt, Robert Keith. Noah's Ark New England Yankees and the Endless Quest: a Short History of the Original Webster Dictionaries, With Particular Reference to Their First Hundred Years (1947). 106 pp
 
 Malone, Kemp. "Webster, Noah," Dictionary of American Biography, Volume 10 (1936)
 
 Morgan, John S. Noah Webster (1975), popular biography
 Moss, Richard J. Noah Webster. (1984). 131 pp. Wester as author
 Nelson, C. Louise. "Neglect of Economic Education in Webster's 'Blue-Backed Speller'" American Economist, Vol. 39, 1995 online edition
 Pelanda, Brian. Declarations of Cultural Independence: The Nationalistic Imperative Behind the Passage of Early American Copyright Laws, 1783–1787 Journal of the Copyright Society of the US, Vol. 58, p. 431, 2011.
 Proudfit, Isabel. Noah Webster Father of the Dictionary (1966).
 
 
 
 Snyder, K. Alan. Defining Noah Webster: Mind and Morals in the Early Republic. (1990). 421 pp.
 
 
 Warfel, Harry R. Noah Webster: Schoolmaster to America (1936), a standard biography

Primary sources
 Harry R. Warfel, ed., Letters of Noah Webster (1953),
 Homer D. Babbidge Jr., ed., Noah Webster: On Being American (1967), selections from his writings
 Webster, Noah. The American Spelling Book: Containing the Rudiments of the English Language for the Use of Schools in the United States by Noah Webster 1836 edition online, the famous Blue- Backed Speller
 Webster, Noah. An American dictionary of the English language 1848 edition online
 Webster, Noah. A grammatical institute of the English language 1800 edition online
 Webster, Noah. Miscellaneous papers on political and commercial subjects 1802 edition online mostly about banks
 Webster, Noah. A collection of essays and fugitiv writings: on moral, historical, political and literary subjects 1790 edition online 414 pages

External links

Noah Webster Family Papers from the Amherst College Archives & Special Collections

 The Noah Webster House & West Hartford Historical Society
 Noah Webster Collection, Special Collections, Jones Library, Amherst MA
 Noah Webster on the Merriam-Webster website
 Connecticut Heritage website
 
 
 
 Searchable Webster's 1828 dictionary and Searchable Webster's 1913 dictionary—both in the public domain.
 Searchable Webster's 1828 wildcard dictionary
 Webster Bible text
 Preface to the Webster Bible
 Downloadable PDF of the Webster Bible
 A proposal for spelling reform from his younger and more radical days
 Online Webster Bible Searchable by verse and keywords
 The American Spelling Book
 Commentary of a Speech by Noah Webster on July 4, 1802

1758 births
1843 deaths
American Congregationalists
American male journalists
American lexicographers
Burials at Grove Street Cemetery
Connecticut Federalists
Converts to Calvinism
English-language spelling reform advocates
English spelling reform
Fellows of the American Academy of Arts and Sciences
Linguists of English
Members of the Connecticut House of Representatives
New York (state) Federalists
Writers from Amherst, Massachusetts
People from Glastonbury, Connecticut
People from Goshen, New York
People from West Hartford, Connecticut
Writers from Hartford, Connecticut
Writers from New Haven, Connecticut
Yale College alumni
Yale University alumni
Language reformers
Members of the New York Manumission Society
American abolitionists
Christian abolitionists